Night Wanderer  is an upcoming Chinese streaming television series co-produced by iQIYI, Yongle Film & Television Production, and Magic Reflection Box, directed by Wan Li Yang, adapted from  the popular time-travel themed novel "Ye Lü Ren" (夜旅人) by Zhao Xi Zhi. It stars Deng Lun and Ni Ni as the main leads. The series is set to be premiered on iQIYI with 36 episodes.

Synopsis 
It tells the love story between a medical examiner and a Republican-era lawyer. The time and space of 2021 and 1937 are staggered in an old apartment building No. 699 in Shanghai in which the two traverses between the intriguing world of Republican Shanghai and modern era.

Cast 
Deng Lun as Sheng Qing Rang
Ni Ni as Zong Ying
Wang Yu Wen as Sheng Qing Hui
Wang Duo as Yin Xi Meng 
Gao Ye as Xue Xuan Qing
Liu Run Nan as Rong Qiang
Yang Shi Ze as Sheng Qiu Shi
Chen Xi Jun as Sheng Qing He
Jampa Tseten as Xiao Ding Jun
Wang Yuan Ke as Sheng Qing Ping
Wang Dong as Sheng Qing Xiang

Production 

On 19 July 2021, the main leads were announced. The opening ceremony was held on July 20. The series was filmed in Hengdian World Studios.  On October 15, the drama released a trailer for the iQIYI iJoy Conference. The series wrapped up on November 13 and released its first official trailer and a set of posters from the cast on November 14.

References 

2020s Chinese television series
Chinese web series